Luis Enrique González Bustamante (born 8 February 1997) is a Mexican professional footballer who plays as a midfielder.

References

External links
 
 
 

1997 births
Living people
Mexican footballers
C.F. Pachuca players
Mineros de Zacatecas players
Footballers from Chihuahua
Association football midfielders